The Kerala State Biodiversity Board (KSBB)  is one of the 28 state biodiversity boards set up by the National Biodiversity Authority in India. It is an autonomous body of the Government of Kerala.

KSBB headquarters is located at Thiruvananthapuram. The board falls under the provision of the State Biodiversity Act set up in 2008 and the Biological Diversity Act, 2002. The Board is headed by a Chairman, a Member Secretary and followed by a team of expert Government officials, leading the board in its activities. As of May 2014, Oommen V Oommen is the Chairman of KSBB.

On 21 May 2014, on the eve of International Day for Biological Diversity KSBB dedicated a project of establishing 'Shanthistals' (biodiversity hubs) to showcase the rich biodiversity of the state at universities and other institutions across the state of Kerala.

References

External links
 Official Website 

2008 establishments in Kerala
Environmental organisations based in India
Environment of Kerala
Biodiversity
Nature conservation organisations based in India
Government agencies established in 2008
State agencies of Kerala
Organisations based in Thiruvananthapuram